Angelic language may refer to:
 Angelic tongues of praise, in Second Temple Judaism
 Enochian, the Angelic language as presented by John Dee and Edward Kelley
 Glossolalia, the "speaking in tongues" of Charismatic Christianity, sometimes interpreted as the speech of angels transmitted through humans

See also
 Language of angels (disambiguation)
 Tongues of Angels (disambiguation)